Gombak (previously known as the Terminal PUTRA LRT station) is an LRT station in Gombak District, Selangor, Malaysia. It is the northern terminus for the RapidKL Kelana Jaya Line.

There is a ticket counter for buses to Genting Highlands, with buses departing to the Genting Skyway station every half-hour. These buses belong to and are operated by Resorts World Berhad and therefore bear their logo on it. This station is normally utilised by residents of Kuala Lumpur, especially those living around Setapak area when they are going to Genting.

The Gombak toll plaza, the beginning of the East Coast Expressway (LPT) , is one kilometre north from this station.

Currently this station is the northernmost in the RapidKL rail transport network.

Plans
Under the Ninth Malaysia Plan, the  transportation hub called Gombak Integrated Transportation Terminal (GITT) are plan to cater for express buses coming in from the east coast of Malaysia similar to Terminal Bersepadu Selatan, an integrated hub in Bandar Tasik Selatan. As of 2022, construction was started and will be connecting with LRT station and under construction of MRL East Coast Rail Link (ECRL).

Feeder buses

See also
 Kelana Jaya Line
 MRL East Coast Rail Link
 Klang Valley Integrated Transit System
 Rail transport in Malaysia

References

External links

 Kuala Lumpur MRT & LRT Integration
 Syarikat Prasarana Negara Bhd

1999 establishments in Malaysia
Gombak District
Kelana Jaya Line
Railway stations opened in 1999
20th-century architecture in Malaysia